Mattias Lamhauge (born 2 August 1999), is a Faroese professional soccer player who plays as a goalkeeper for B36 Tórshavn.

References

External links

1999 births
Living people
Faroe Islands international footballers
Association football goalkeepers
Faroese footballers
B36 Tórshavn players
Argja Bóltfelag players
Havnar Bóltfelag players